Bakdaulet Talgatuly Zulfikarov (born 11 March 2001) is a Kazakhstani professional footballer who plays for Turan.

References

External links 
 
 

2001 births
Living people
People from Shymkent
Kazakhstani footballers
Kazakhstani expatriate footballers
Expatriate footballers in Belarus
Association football forwards
FC Kyran players
FC Energetik-BGU Minsk players
FC Turan players